Fuente Olímpica is a fountain and sculpture in Guadalajara, in the Mexican state of Jalisco.

References

Fountains in Mexico
Outdoor sculptures in Guadalajara